Arthur Lee "Archie" Eversole (July 26, 1984 – April 3, 2022) was an American rapper best known for his 2002 single "We Ready".

Early life
Eversole was born in Germany while his military parents were stationed in the country. His parents would move to College Park, Georgia, where he was raised.

Career
Eversole recorded his lone full-length album, Ride Wit Me Dirty South Style, when he was seventeen years old. It was first released in 2001 by independent label Phat Boy Records and then rereleased by MCA Records in 2002, peaking at #83 on the Billboard 200 and #16 on Top R&B/Hip-Hop Albums. The featured single, "We Ready", contained a sample of the 1969 Steam song "Na Na Hey Hey Kiss Him Goodbye". Though it only reached #64 on the Billboard Hot R&B/Hip-Hop Songs chart, the track proved popular in the sports world, as it was included in promotional material for the National Football League and was played during home matches of the Major League Soccer club Atlanta United, while the Kansas City Royals adopted it as their anthem for their 2014 MLB postseason campaign. A music video was filmed for a remix of the song that featured Bubba Sparxxx.

In 2018, Eversole recorded "United We Conquer", a fight song dedicated to Atlanta United.

Death
On March 25, 2022, Eversole was found by police at a Decatur gas station with a gunshot wound to his face. He said that someone had broken into his bedroom and shot him while he was asleep. Eversole was hospitalized but died from his injuries at age 37 on April 3. His brother, Alexander Krause, was arrested at Eversole's home and charged with murder after officers had noticed bloodstains on his socks.

Discography

Albums

Singles

As lead artist

As featured artist 
"ATL", Baby D featuring Archie Eversole, Pastor Troy, and Lil Jon, 2002

See also
List of murdered hip hop musicians

References

External links
Archie Eversole on Discogs
Archie Eversole on MCARecords.com (archived)

1984 births
2022 deaths
Male murder victims
Southern hip hop musicians
Hardcore hip hop artists
African-American male rappers
21st-century African-American people
20th-century African-American people
Rappers from Atlanta